"Me and Jesus" is a song by the Christian band Stellar Kart, from their album We Can't Stand Sitting Down. It was released as a single on July 26, 2006.

The song spent seven weeks as a number-one single and was the eleventh-most-played song of 2006 on Christian radio. There is a music video for this song.

Awards 

In 2007, the song won the GMA Dove Award for Rock/Contemporary Recorded Song of the Year, at the 38th GMA Dove Awards. It was also nominated for Song of the Year.

References

2006 singles
Stellar Kart songs
2006 songs
Songs written by Ian Eskelin